Dmitry Smirnov may refer to:

Dmitry Alexandrovich Smirnov (born 1980), Russian association football player
Dmitry Matveyevich Smirnov (1919–2005), mathematician
Dmitri Smirnov (tenor) (1882–1944), Russian tenor
Dmitri Smirnov (composer) (Dmitri Nikolaevich Smirnov, 1948–2020), Russian-British composer
Dmitri N. Smirnov (footballer) (born 1980), Russian association football player
Dmitri Smirnov (footballer, born 1969), Russian association football player
Dmitry Smirnov (entrepreneur) (born 1958), Russian politician, executive, and entrepreneur
Dmitry Smirnov (weightlifter) (born 1973), Russian Olympic weightlifter

See also
 Smirnov (surname)
 Smirnoff (surname)